Derafsh-e Sofla (also Romanized as Derafsh-e Soflá; also known as Derafsh-e Pā’īn) is a village in Jowzar Rural District, in the Central District of Mamasani County, Fars Province, Iran. At the 2006 census, its population was 114, in 26 families.

References 

Populated places in Mamasani County